HMS Precept (Z266) was a net laying ship for the Royal Navy during the Second World War acquired from the United States Navy in October 1944 via Lend-Lease.

On 17 January 1944, while still under construction, the ship was reclassified as a net laying ship and redesignated AN-73. Precept was launched on 11 April and completed on 13 October.

After delivery to the U.S. Navy on 14 October, she was transferred to the United Kingdom under Lend-Lease the same day and commissioned into the Royal Navy as HMS Precept (Z266). Upon completion of wartime duty with the United Kingdom, she arrived at Norfolk, Virginia, on 22 October 1945, and was returned to the U.S. Navy on 4 January 1946. Struck from the Naval Vessel Register on 28 March 1946, she was transferred to the United States Maritime Commission on 21 March 1947 and sold.

References 
 
 YN-79 / AN-73 Precept, HMS Precept (Z-266)

 

Ailanthus-class boom defence vessels of the Royal Navy
Ships built in New Bern, North Carolina
1944 ships
World War II net laying ships